Mausoleum of Yacoub bin Abd al-Rahman is a mausoleum dedicated to Yacoub bin Abd al-Rahman, tabi‘e, qāriʾ and hadith narrator. It is located at the Fouad Street in the Alexandria, Egypt.

Description
After the sedition of the killing of Husayn ibn Ali, Yacoub bin Abd al-Rahman (died in 181 AH) travelled to Alexandria with his companion Abdullah ibn Ali Zayn al-Abidin.

This Mausoleum built in the Islamic style with a dome carved with parts of Ayat al-Kursi.

Gallery

References

Mausoleums in Egypt